Santiago Island is an island located off the northeast coast of Bolinao, Pangasinan, Philippines. It is composed of six barangays namely Binabalian, Goyoden, Lucero, Pilar, Salud, and Victory, all within the municipality of Bolinao. Located in this island is the Giant Clam Ocean Nursery and Marine Protected Areas (MPAs). It is ideal for various aquatic activities like scuba-diving, snorkeling, and boating.

Fourteen Mile Reef

The Fourteen Mile Reef off the coast of Santiago Island is several kilometers long and is actually an extension of the western edge of Lingayen Gulf. It has some hard and soft coral growth, many shells and variety of fish.

See also
 List of islands of the Philippines

References

Islands of Pangasinan